Hendrikus van Rijnsoever (born 6 November 1952) is a Dutch former footballer who played as a defender for AZ '67 Alkmaar. He made one appearance for the Netherlands national team in 1975.

References

External links
 

1952 births
Living people
Footballers from Utrecht (city)
Dutch footballers
Association football defenders
Netherlands international footballers
AZ Alkmaar players